This is a list of flags that are inscribed with Arabic-language text.

List

Shahada
The following flags contain text of a variant of the Shahada, which is usually rendered لا إله إلا الله محمد رسول الله ("There is no god but God; Muhammad is the messenger of God.")

Takbir
The following flags contain text of the Takbir, which is usually rendered  (Allahu akbar, "God is great")

See also
List of inscribed flags

Notes

Arabic language
List
Flags